is a national highway between Usuki, Ōita and Taketa, Ōita in Japan. It has a total length of 53.3 km (33.1 mi).

Route description
A section of National Route 502 in Taketa is a musical road.

References

502
Roads in Ōita Prefecture
Musical roads in Japan